Curry, a spicy Asian-derived dish, is a popular meal in the United Kingdom. Curry recipes have been printed in Britain since 1747, when Hannah Glasse gave a recipe for a chicken curry. In the 19th century, many more recipes appeared in the popular cookery books of the time. Curries in Britain are widely described using Indian terms, such as korma for a mild sauce with almond and coconut, Madras for a hot, slightly sour sauce, and pasanda for a mild sauce with cream and coconut milk. One type of curry, chicken tikka masala, was created in Britain, and has become widespread enough to be described as the national dish.

The first South Asian curry house opened in London in 1810. More followed early in the 20th century; Veeraswamy, founded in 1926, is the oldest surviving South Asian restaurant in Britain. By the 1970s, over three-quarters of the South Asian restaurants in the country were owned and run by people of Bengali origin, mainly from the Sylhet area.

National dish

Curry is very popular in the United Kingdom, with a curry house in nearly every town. Such is the popularity of curry in the United Kingdom, it has frequently been called its "adopted national dish". It was estimated that in 2016 there were 12,000 curry houses, employing 100,000 people and with annual combined sales of approximately £4.2 billion.

The food offered is South Asian food cooked to British taste, but with increasing demand for authentic South Asian styles. As of 2015, curry houses accounted for a fifth of the restaurant business in the U.K. but, being historically a low wage sector, they were plagued by a shortage of labour. Established South Asian immigrants from India, Pakistan, Bangladesh were moving on to other occupations; there were difficulties in training Europeans to cook curry; and immigration restrictions, which require payment of a high wage to skilled immigrants, had crimped the supply of new cooks.

History 

The first curry recipe in Britain was published in The Art of Cookery made Plain and Easy by Hannah Glasse in 1747. The first edition of her book used only black pepper and coriander seeds for seasoning of "currey". By the fourth edition of the book, other ingredients such as turmeric and ginger were called for. The use of hot spices was not mentioned, which reflected the limited use of chili in South Asia — chili plants had only been introduced into South Asia around the late 16th century and at that time were only popular in southern India.

Many curry recipes appeared in 19th century cookery books such as those of Charles Elmé Francatelli and Mrs Beeton. In Mrs Beeton's Book of Household Management, a recipe for curry powder contains coriander, turmeric, cinnamon, cayenne, mustard, ginger, allspice and fenugreek; although she notes that it is more economical to purchase the powder at "any respectable shop". Throughout the 19th and early 20th centuries, curry grew increasingly popular in Britain owing to the large number of British civil servants and military personnel associated with the British Raj. Following World War II, curry became even more popular in Britain owing to the large number of immigrants from South Asia. Curry has become an integral part of British cuisine, so much so that, since the late 1990s, chicken tikka masala has been referred to as "a true British national dish".

Curry house 

In 1810, the entrepreneur Sake Dean Mahomed, from the Bengal Presidency, opened the first South Asian curry house in England: the Hindoostanee Coffee House in London. Before then, curry had been served in some London Coffee Houses.

The first modern "upscale" South Asian restaurant in Britain is thought to have been The Shafi in 1915, followed by Veeraswamy in London's Regent Street, founded in 1926; the latter is still standing and is the oldest surviving South Asian restaurant in Britain.

Bengalis in the UK settled in big cities with industrial employment. In London, they settled in the East End, which for centuries has been the first port of call for many immigrants working in the docks and shipping from east Bengal. Their regular stopover paved the way for food and curry outlets to be opened up catering for an all-male workforce as family migration and settlement took place some decades later. Brick Lane in the East London Borough of Tower Hamlets is famous for its many curry houses.

Until the early 1970s, more than three-quarters of South Asian restaurants in Britain were identified as being owned and run by people of Bengali origin. Most were run by migrants from East Pakistan, which became Bangladesh in 1971. Bangladeshi restaurateurs overwhelmingly come from the northeastern division of Sylhet. Until 1998, as many as 85% of curry restaurants in the UK were British Bangladeshi restaurants, but in 2003 this figure declined to just over 65%. The dominance of Bangladeshi restaurants is generally declining in some parts of London and the further north one travels. In Glasgow, there are more restaurants of Punjabi origin than any other.

In the early 2010s the popularity of the curry house saw a decline. This has been attributed to the sale of this style of food in generic restaurants, increased home cooking of this style of food with easy supermarket availability of ingredients, and immigration restrictions brought in from 2008 making the availability of low-wage chefs and other staff difficult.

Regardless of the ethnic origin of a restaurant's ownership, the menu is influenced by the wider South Asian cuisine, and sometimes cuisines from further afield, such as Persian dishes.

Better quality restaurants make up new sauces on a daily basis, using fresh ingredients wherever possible and grinding their own spices. More modest establishments may resort to frozen or dried ingredients and pre-packaged spice mixtures.

Varieties 

Restaurants in Great Britain use South Asian terms to identify popular dishes. Although the names derive from traditional South Asian dishes, the recipes have often been adapted to suit western tastes. Representative names include:

 Balti – a style of curry thought to have been developed in Birmingham, traditionally cooked and served in a cast iron pot called a balty.
 Bhuna – medium, thick sauce, with some vegetables.
 Biryani – spiced rice and meat cooked together and usually served with vegetable curry sauce.
 Dhansak – in the curry house, it may be made with either lamb or chicken and frequently contains pineapple. 
 Dopiaza – medium curry containing onions which have been both boiled and fried.
 Jalfrezi – onion, green chili and a thick sauce.
 Kofta – dishes containing meatballs (most frequently lamb or beef), or vegetable meat-substitutes (most often ground nuts).
 Korma – mild, yellow in colour, with almond and coconut powder.
 Madras curry – "the standard hot, slightly sour curry at the Indian restaurant."
 Pasanda – a mild curry sauce made with cream, coconut milk, and almonds or cashews, served with lamb, chicken, or king prawns.
 Pathia – a hot curry, generally similar to a "Madras" with the addition of lemon juice and tomato purée.
 Phaal – "the hottest curry the restaurants can make. There is nothing like it in India – it is pure invention."
 Roghan josh – a medium-spicy curry, usually of lamb/beef with a deep red sauce containing tomatoes and paprika.
 Sambar – medium-heat, sour curry made with lentils and tamarind.
 Tandoori, Tikka – dry pieces of tandoori chicken and chicken tikka, spiced and cooked in the tandoor, a cylindrical clay oven.
 Vindaloo – generally regarded as the classic "hot" restaurant curry.

References 

 
Curry
British cuisine
National dishes